Catalina Island  or Isla Catalina is a tropical island located 1.5 miles from the mainland on the south-east corner of the Dominican Republic, near La Altagracia and La Romana. It is an occasional destination for cruise ships on Caribbean routes. In particular, Costa Cruises has a private beach on the island. Their ships anchor offshore and transport passengers to shore via tender.

Geography

The island itself is only 9.6 square kilometers in size, and is a diverse preservation of eco-systems including sand dunes, mangroves, and reefs. Formed out of coral stone, the island contains three overlapping plateaus. The highest elevation on the island is only 60 feet above sea level. The seas around the Island are rich in wildlife, with many species of birds and tropical marine fish, and there are large areas where natural sandbars offshore bring the depth to just a few feet.

History

The island was baptized "Santa Catalina" by Christopher Columbus, who visited it in May 1494.

William Kidd's Quedagh Merchant
On December 13, 2007, the shipwreck of a 17th-century merchant vessel was found at a depth of three meters roughly 70 meters off of the island. It has since been identified as the pirate Captain William Kidd's 1699 Quedagh Merchant, also known as the Cara Merchant, according to Kidd's original testimony during his trial prior to his hanging on May 23, 1701. A team of researchers from Indiana University led by Charles Beeker, Director of the Office of Underwater Science at Indiana University, first discovered the wreckage in 2007 and have since established a Marine Protected Area in an attempt to preserve both the archaeological remains of the shipwreck and its surrounding reef ecosystem. The famed shipwreck has been nominated as a Living Museum in the Sea. Living Museums in the Sea is a program started by Charles Beeker with the goal of protecting submerged cultural and biological resources around the world.

In a partnership with the Children's Museum of Indianapolis and the Oficina Nacional de Patrimonio Cultural Subacuático (ONPCS), Indiana University recovered one of the 26 cannons found on the wreckage of the Quedagh Merchant. The cannon is now on display at the "National Geographic: Treasures of the Earth" exhibit in Indianapolis. At the Children's Museum of Indianapolis, Indiana University students teach visitors about the Quedagh Merchant as well as the history of the country, maritime history, artifact conservation, and archaeology.

Tourism
The island is a popular destination, and ships travel daily to Catalina from La Romana to visit the beach, snorkel, and view the corals close to the shore.

Scuba diving 

Catalina Island is a popular destination for scuba diving thanks to its coral reef and marine ecosystems. Dive sites include the Wall and the Aquarium; tropical fish that can be seen there include the sergeant major, damselfish, squirrelfish, and stingrays. There are weekly trips to Catalina  from Punta Cana.

Boating and sailing 
The island has also enjoyed a dedicated yacht and boating presence through the years, with many visitors, Catalina also offers wonderful opportunities for those who enjoy sailing and diving. Isla Catalinas beaches and the surrounding waters are a perfect place for sailing, boating and fishing. The island has enjoyed a dedicated yacht and boating presence through the years, with many world-class yachts being anchored in beautiful Catalina Island.

See also 
 Isla Saona

References

Islands of the Dominican Republic
Geography of Hispaniola